The Peter Rodgers Organization (PRO) is a television syndication company based in Hollywood, California. It distributes more than 2,000 films, and dozens of documentaries and off-network television series to global markets. Including The Rifleman starring Chuck Connors.

History

The company was founded in 1976 by Peter S. Rodgers, a Viennese escapee of Nazi persecution, who arrived in the United States in 1938. Following a distinguished tour of service in the United States Army as a military intelligence officer during World War II, Rodgers moved to Los Angeles in 1954 to work for National Telefilm Associates (NTA), where he would serve as Vice President of Domestic Distribution and Sales, reporting to President and Chairman of the Board Ely Landau.

In 1976, he left NTA to form the Peter Rodgers Organization. Over the last four decades, the company has represented and managed the rights to classic television shows.

Peter Rodgers died on February 21, 1988, at age 68. He was succeeded by his son, Stephen Rodgers.

Rodgers' death left family members arguing, with some of them wanting to liquidate the prestigious and prosperous entertainment company he had formed. After resulting legal clashes, Rodgers’ son Stephen surrendered all inheritance left to him by his father, and purchased the agency from the estate in 1988. He has served as its CEO since that time. At the time, Stephen Rodgers was believed to be the youngest CEO of any active business in this field, having succeeded his father at age 25.

References 

Film distributors of the United States
Television syndication distributors
Entertainment companies based in California
Companies based in Los Angeles
Entertainment companies established in 1976
1976 establishments in California